Wong Chun Ho (born 31 May 1990 in Hong Kong) is a Hong Kong professional football player who currently plays as a right back or a defensive midfielder for Hong Kong Premier League club Lee Man.

Club career

In 2009, Wong joined Hong Kong First Division club Happy Valley.

In 2010, Wong joined First Division club Sun Hei.

On 6 May 2012, Wong scored a goal in second half for Sun Hei against Sham Shui Po, which the match wins 1:0.

In 2014, Wong joined Hong Kong Premier League club YFCMD.

In 2015, Wong joined HKPL club Pegasus. Prior to the start of the 2017-18 campaign, Wong was named as Pegasus vice captain.

On 3 July 2020, Wong joined Lee Man.

References

External links
 
 Wong Chun Ho at HKFA
 

1990 births
Living people
Hong Kong footballers
Hong Kong First Division League players
Hong Kong Premier League players
Happy Valley AA players
Sun Hei SC players
Metro Gallery FC players
TSW Pegasus FC players
Lee Man FC players
Association football defenders
Association football midfielders
Hong Kong League XI representative players